Electro Quarterstaff is an instrumental metal band hailing from Winnipeg, Manitoba, Canada. They play a form of progressive/technical heavy metal and employ three lead guitarists.  Initially consisting of just three guitarists and a drummer, they added a bassist to their line-up in winter 2006 and played their first show with him in autumn 2007.  The band is named for a weapon in the Canadian cartoon Rocket Robin Hood.

The band self-released the Swayze EP in 2004.  They later signed with Willowtip Records for their debut full-length album in 2006, Gretzky, which included rerecorded and reworked versions of their earlier tracks. Also in 2006 they toured the United States and Canada for the first time, which included a performance at the Maryland Deathfest.

Members
 Josh Bedry – guitar
 Drew Johnston – guitar
 Andrew Dickens – guitar
 Dan Ryckman – drums
 Marty Thiessen – bass guitar

Discography
 Swayze (EP - 2004)
 Gretzky (LP/CD - 2006)
 Aykroyd (LP/CD - 2011)

References

External links
Bandcamp page
MySpace page
Electro Quarterstaff on Willowtip Records
Official Forums

Canadian progressive metal musical groups
Musical groups from Winnipeg
Musical groups established in 2001
2001 establishments in Manitoba